Conospermum brachyphyllum is a shrub endemic to Western Australia.

Description
It blooms between August and October producing white flowers.

Distribution
It is found along the west coast areas of the Mid West and Wheatbelt regions of Western Australia from Irwin to Dandaragan where it grows in sandy soils over laterite and gravel.

References

External links

Eudicots of Western Australia
brachyphyllum
Endemic flora of Western Australia
Plants described in 1839